Uta Streckert (born 23 March 1994) is a German female paralympic athlete. She went onto compete at the 2016 Summer Paralympics representing Germany.

She also participated in the 2011 IPC Athletics World Championships and won a bronze medal in the Women's 200 metres event.

References

External links 
 
 

1994 births
Living people
German female sprinters
German disabled sportspeople
Paralympic athletes of Germany
Athletes (track and field) at the 2016 Summer Paralympics